Philip, Phillip, or Phil Harper may refer to:

Philip Harper (trumpeter) (born 1965), American jazz trumpeter
Philip Harper (brewer) (born 1967), English master sake brewer in Japan
Phil Harper (1940–2004), American voice actor
Phillip Harper, fictional son of Thelma Harper